is a Japanese women's professional shogi player ranked 2-dan.

Promotion history
Idō's promotion history is as follows.
 2-kyū: April 1, 2005
 1-kyū: April 1, 2006
 1-dan: December 3, 2008
 2-dan: June 28, 2017

Note: All ranks are women's professional ranks.

References

External links

 ShogiHub: Idō, Chihiro
 

Japanese shogi players
Living people
Women's professional shogi players
1988 births
People from Ishikawa Prefecture
Professional shogi players from Ishikawa Prefecture